The women's field hockey tournament at the 1988 Summer Olympics was the 3rd edition of the field hockey event for women at the Summer Olympic Games. It was held over a ten-day period beginning on 21 September, and culminating with the medal finals on 30 September. All games were played at the Seongnam Stadium in Seoul, South Korea.

Australia won the gold medal for the first time after defeating South Korea 2–0 in the final. Netherlands won the bronze medal by defeating Great Britain 3–1.

Squads

Results

Preliminary round

Group A

Group B

Fifth to eighth place classification

Cross-overs

Seventh and eighth place

Fifth and sixth place

Medal round

Semi-finals

Bronze medal match

Gold medal match

Final ranking

Goalscorers

References

External links
Official FIH website

1988
Women's tournament
1988 in women's field hockey
1988 Summer Olympics
Field